Daniele Fiorentino (born 4 November 1988) is an Italian professional football football player who plays for Nardò.

Career

United Sly
On 9 December 2019 it was confirmed, that Fiorentino had joined Promozione club United Sly FC.

References

External links
 

1988 births
Living people
People from Terlizzi
Italian footballers
Serie B players
Serie C players
Serie D players
S.S.C. Bari players
Aurora Pro Patria 1919 players
Venezia F.C. players
Paganese Calcio 1926 players
A.S. Noicattaro Calcio players
S.S. Fidelis Andria 1928 players
A.S.D. Martina Calcio 1947 players
A.S. Bisceglie Calcio 1913 players
A.S.D. Barletta 1922 players
Association football midfielders
Footballers from Apulia
Sportspeople from the Metropolitan City of Bari